The following is a list of pipeline accidents in the United States in 2012. It is one of several lists of U.S. pipeline accidents. See also list of natural gas and oil production accidents in the United States.

Incidents 

This is not a complete list of all pipeline accidents. For natural gas alone, the Pipeline and Hazardous Materials Safety Administration (PHMSA), a United States Department of Transportation agency, has collected data on more than 3,200 accidents deemed serious or significant since 1987.

A "significant incident" results in any of the following consequences:
 fatality or injury requiring in-patient hospitalization
 $50,000 or more in total costs, measured in 1984 dollars
 liquid releases of five or more barrels (42 US gal/barrel)
 releases resulting in an unintentional fire or explosion

PHMSA and the National Transportation Safety Board (NTSB) post incident data and results of investigations into accidents involving pipelines that carry a variety of products, including natural gas, oil, diesel fuel, gasoline, kerosene, jet fuel, carbon dioxide, and other substances. Occasionally pipelines are repurposed to carry different products.

 A 30-inch gas pipeline exploded and burned, in Estill County, Kentucky, on the evening of January 2. The rupture created a crater approximately 86 feet long by 22 feet wide, and expelled a number of pieces of pipe as far as 800 feet from the rupture center. Flames were reported reaching over 1,000 feet high. Residents up to a mile away from the failure were evacuated. There were no injuries. The cause was overstress from land movement.
 A forest fire caused a gas pipeline to explode and burn in Floyd County, Kentucky on January 7. There were no injuries from this incident.
 On January 9, a man was killed, and another person injured, in a fiery house explosion from a leaking 4-inch cast iron gas main installed in 1950 in Austin, Texas. Gas had been smelled in the area for several weeks prior to this. Gas company crews had looked along the affected property for a leak, but were unable to find it.
 A Sunoco pipeline ruptured and spilled about 117,000 gallons of gasoline, in Wellington, Ohio, late on January 12. Some residents were evacuated for a week.
 On January 13, an 8-inch gas pipeline exploded and burned, in a vacant agricultural field, in Rio Vista, California. There were no injuries or evacuations.
 A Tennessee Gas Pipeline gas compressor had a major leak "that sounded like a rocket" in Powell County, Kentucky, forcing evacuations of nearby residents on January 14. There was no fire or injuries reported.
 A contractor excavating for a communications company caused a massive gas explosion and fire at a condominium complex on January 16 in West Haverstraw, New York, injuring two firefighters and two utility workers. Afterwards, it was found that the excavator's insurance will be insufficient to cover all of the property damage of the incident.
 On January 18, the original Colonial Pipeline mainline failed in Belton, South Carolina, spilling about 13,500 gallons of petroleum product. The failure was caused by internal corrosion.
 Workers in Topeka, Kansas were installing a yard sprinkler system on January 30 when they hit a gas line. Gas from the leak later on exploded in a nearby house, burning a 73-year-old woman, who died several weeks later.
 On January 31, a Shell Oil Company fuel pipeline to the Milwaukee, Wisconsin Mitchell International Airport was found to be leaking. Jet fuel had been smelled for about two weeks in the area, and was found in runoff water in the area. The cause was from external corrosion. About 9,000 gallons of fuel were spilled. In 2014, a Shell employee was scheduled to plead guilty to charges of falsifying records of the pipeline.
 On February 13, a Florida Gas Transmission Company 30-inch gas transmission pipeline burst near Baton Rouge, Louisiana. Residents in the area were evacuated for a time, but there was no fire. The pipe, manufactured in 1965, ruptured due to external corrosion. DOT/PHMSA assessed a fine of $197,200 against FGT for 2 violations of safety regulations on corrosion control and issued a corrective order.
 On February 15, 2012, in Arenac County, Michigan, oil was discovered in the soil around a 30-inch Enbridge crude oil pipeline. About 800 gallons of crude oil were spilled.
 Two cars that were drag racing went off the road and crashed through a fence and into a crude oil pipeline in New Lenox, Illinois on March 3. The pipeline was ruptured, and the crude oil ignited. Two men from the vehicles were killed, and three others seriously burned.
 On March 5, a leak at an Enid, Oklahoma pipeline storage facility spread propane fumes in the area, forcing evacuations. There was no fire or explosion.
 A crude oil pipeline leaked near Grand Isle, Louisiana on March 17, spilling as much as 8,400 gallons of crude oil. There were no injuries reported.
 On March 29, an employee accidentally left a valve open during maintenance work on a Williams Companies gas compressor station near Springville Township, Pennsylvania. Later, gas leaked through the valve, causing alarms to evacuate workers in the compressor building. Later, the gas exploded and burned. There were no injuries. It was also found there are no agencies enforcing rules on rural gas facilities in that state.
 On April 2, Transcontinental Gas Pipeline Company, reported a leak on their 72nd Street Interstate Transmission Lateral located in North Bergen, New Jersey. Workers discovered a rock in contact with the bottom of the pipe. Upon removing the rock, the pipeline began to leak. There was no fire or injuries reported as a result of this incident.
 A 12-inch gas pipeline exploded and burned for five hours near Gary, Texas on April 4. There were no injuries, but the rupture site was only 200 feet from that pipeline's compressor station.
 On April 6, two gas company workers were mildly burned when attempting to fix a leak on a 4-inch gas pipeline in DeSoto County, Mississippi. The pipeline exploded and burned during the repairs.
 On April 9, a Texas Gas Transmission 16-inch diameter natural gas pipeline exploded and burned in Terrebonne Parish, Louisiana. The pipe, manufactured in 1961, failed due to corrosion. The accident was reported first by a satellite monitoring the area to the NRC. There were no injuries.
 Two men escaped with only minor burns after a bulldozer they were using hit a 24-inch gas pipeline near Hinton, Iowa on April 25. Authorities later announced the men did not call 811 for an underground utility locate.
 On April 28, an ExxonMobil 20/22-inch-diameter pipeline ruptured near Torbert in Pointe Coupee Parish, Louisiana, about 20 miles west of Baton Rouge, and crude oil spilled into the surrounding area, and flowed into an unnamed tributary connected to Bayou Cholpe. About 117,000 gallons of crude were spilled, with about 37,000 gallons being lost. The pipeline failed due to a manufacturing defect.
 A 26-inch gas transmission pipeline ruptured on June 6 in a compressor station near Laketon in northeastern Gray County, Texas. Gas escaped from the 50-foot-long rupture, igniting, leaving a crater 30 feet in diameter, burning two acres of agricultural area and telephone poles. There were no injuries.
 On June 8, near Canadian, Texas, a trackhoe operator suffered burns, after a fire from a leaking 4-inch gas-gathering pipeline that was undergoing maintenance. Fumes entered the engine of the trackhoe and ignited.
 A contractor was killed and two others injured after an explosion at a BP gas compressor station in Durango, Colorado on June 25. BP, Halliburton, and the other contractors were fined $7,000 each for safety violations in that work.
 A West Shore Pipe Line petroleum products pipeline burst near Jackson, Wisconsin on July 17, releasing about 54,000 gallons of gasoline. At least one family self evacuated due to the leak. At least 44 water wells nearby were contaminated from benzine in the gasoline, including a municipal well. A LF-ERW seam failure was suspected as the cause. Further testing revealed that at least 26 other areas on this pipeline needed repairs, with 22 within the Jackson Marsh Wildlife Area.
 A 14-inch gas gathering pipeline exploded and burned on July 18 near Intracoastal City, Louisiana. There were no injuries or major property damage reported.
 On July 23, a compressor station operated by Williams Companies in Windsor, New York was venting gas in a "routine procedure" — during a lightning storm — when the vent was ignited by lightning, causing a fireball "hundreds of feet into the air"
 An Enbridge crude oil pipeline ruptured in Grand Marsh, Wisconsin, releasing an estimated 1,200 barrels of crude oil. The pipeline had been installed in 1998. Flaws in the longitudinal welds had been seen during X-ray checks of girth welds.
 Four contract workers were injured during a flash fire at a Wyoming gas processing plant on August 22.
 A jet fuel pipeline near Chicago began leaking on August 27. The burst pipeline spilled an estimated 42,000 gallons of jet fuel into a ditch that empties into the Calumet Sag Channel in Palos Heights, Illinois. External corrosion was the cause of the pipeline failure.
 On August 28, an Atmos Energy repair crew struck an 8-inch gas main in McKinney, Texas, causing a fire. Four Atmos workers were treated for injuries. 1,000 Atmos gas customers lost gas service for a time.
 On September 6, a 10-inch gas gathering pipeline exploded and burned near Alice, Texas. Flames reached 100 feet high, and caused a 10-acre brush fire. There were no injuries.
 An explosion and fire hit a Crestwood Midstream Partners gas compressor station in Hood County, Texas on September 6. Heavy damage to a sheet metal building resulted, but there were no injuries reported to crew there.
 A Colorado Interstate Gas gas compressor in Rio Blanco County, Colorado caught fire on September 11. There were no reported injuries.
 On September 24, an excavator struck a 4-inch natural gas line on Route 416 in Montgomery, New York. Escaping gas ignited, and it took 90 minutes before the gas was shut off. There were no injuries.
 On October 3, a Colonial Pipeline stubline leaked gasoline into in a marshy area of Moccasin Bend, about 1,000 feet from the Tennessee River, near Chattanooga, Tennessee. About 3,600 gallons of gasoline were spilled, with about 1000 gallons being lost. The cause was from previous excavation damage.
 The operator of an excavator machine narrowly escaped serious injury in Lewiston, Idaho on November 19, when his machine hit a gas pipeline during road work. The resulting fire destroyed a railroad signal, along with several telephone poles, and road construction equipment. The depth of the pipeline had been misjudged at that location.
 On November 20, about 38,000 gallons of crude oil spilled from an Enbridge pipeline at a tank farm in Mokena, Illinois.
 Two men were injured in an explosion and fire at a natural gas production facility east of Price, Utah on November 20.
 On November 23, a gas company worker looking for the source of a reported gas leak in a Springfield, Massachusetts strip club pierced a gas line. The gas later exploded, injuring 21, devastating the strip club, and damaging numerous nearby buildings.
 On November 30, a heavy equipment operator punctured a 12-inch gas transmission pipeline, near the city of Madera, California. The adjacent highway, along with several rural roads, was shut down for hours, while houses and businesses in the area were evacuated.
 A malfunction in a gas compressor caused a fire on December 4, north of Fort Worth, Texas. There were no injuries.
 On December 5, a 16-inch gas pipeline at 500 psi of pressure exploded and burned near a natural gas plant in Goldsmith, Texas. A fireball 250 feet high was created after the explosion, destroying 12 to 15 utility poles, and caliche and rocks the size of bowling balls damaged a road. There were no injuries reported.
 On December 11, at approximately 12:40pm, a 20-inch gas pipeline owned by NiSource Inc., parent of Columbia Gas, exploded along I-77 between Sissonville and Pocatalico, West Virginia. A piece of the pipe twenty feet long was blown out of the ground and had a longitudinal crack that ran the entire twenty feet. The escaping high-pressure natural gas ignited immediately. An area of fire damage about 820 feet wide extended nearly 1,100 feet along the pipeline right-of-way. Three houses were destroyed by the fire, and several other houses were damaged. There were no fatalities or serious injuries. The asphalt pavement of the northbound and southbound lanes of I-77 was heavily damaged by the intense fire. NTSB determined that the probable cause of the pipeline rupture was (1) external corrosion of the pipe wall due to deteriorated coating and ineffective cathodic protection and (2) the failure to detect the corrosion because the pipeline was not inspected or tested after 1988. Contributing to the poor condition of the corrosion protection systems was the rocky backfill used around the buried pipe. Early reports announced the NTSB was investigating as to why alarms in the control room for this pipeline did not sound for this failure. The pipe was manufactured in 1967.
 On December 26, a 20-inch Florida Gas Transmission Company pipeline ruptured near Melbourne, Florida, ejecting a 20-foot section of the pipeline. There was no fire or injuries.

References 

Lists of pipeline accidents in the United States